Jesse Huta Galung won the title, beating Daniel Muñoz de la Nava 6–3, 6–4

Seeds

Draw

Finals

Top half

Bottom half

References
 Main Draw
 Qualifying Draw

2014 ATP Challenger Tour
2014 Singles
2014 in Dutch sport